Montalba is an unincorporated community in central Anderson County, Texas, United States. According to the Handbook of Texas, the community had a population of 809 in 2019. It is located within the Palestine, Texas micropolitan area.

History
Hamlett named the settlement Montalba, and it is thought to be named this because of the white sand on a mountain located east of the community. The post office was originally located at Beaver Valley, a community located about two or three miles north of the settlement, in 1848. P.G. Oldham was one of the first settlers in the community, in which he built a home just northwest of the settlement in 1853. A church called Beaver Valley Primitive Baptist Church was located near the community. A cemetery was established in the settlement and became known as Holly Springs. The location of Beaver Valley and Montalba on a road between Palestine and Athens made both of those communities central gathering places for farmers in the area. Beaver Valley did this first, then Montalba. The community's early industry is unknown, but there is a foundry that was used during the Civil War to make firearms and ammunition within the community's loose boundaries. It is mostly agrarian, and the community is both a supply point and a local market. There were two gas stations, a combined gas station and general store, a 4-H Club building, a community center, a post office, numerous homes, and three churches in Montalba in 1978. It has had several populations. Its population nadir was 50 in both 1925 and 1933, and its population zenith was 300 in 1931. It reached 200 residents in 1964 and then plunged to 110 between 1974 and 1989. It had a population of 110 from that year through 2000.

Although Montalba is unincorporated, it has a post office, with the ZIP code of 75853.

Geography

Education
The Primitive Baptist church located in the community in 1853 was also used as a school. The community's school originated when Mrs. Peter G. Adams and Mrs. B.H. Brooks worked together to join the schools in Black Rock and Pace's Chapel together since the surrounding school districts joined them as well. This district had 188 White and 183 African American children enrolled in 1933. Today the community is served by the Palestine Independent School District.

Notable people
Elton Bomer, formerly state representative and Texas Secretary of State, resides in Montalba.

References

Unincorporated communities in Anderson County, Texas
Unincorporated communities in Texas